Jemmy van Hoboken (1900-1962) was a Dutch painter.

Biography
Hoboken was born on 30 August 1900 in The Hague. She studied at the Haags Tekeninstituut Bik en Vaandrager. She studied with Erwin Knirr, Han van Meegeren, and Walter Thor. Hoboken's work was included in the 1939 exhibition and sale Onze Kunst van Heden (Our Art of Today) at the Rijksmuseum in Amsterdam.

Hoboken died on 22 February 1962 in Wageningen.

References

External links
images of Hoboken's art on ArtNet

1900 births
1962 deaths
Artists from The Hague
Dutch women artists